Thomas Tyler Bouldin (1781 – February 11, 1834) was an American lawyer and politician who served as a U.S. Representative from Virginia, serving non-consecutive terms between 1829 and 1834. 

He was the brother of James Wood Bouldin, who succeeded him in Congress following his death.

Biography
Born near Charlotte Court House, Virginia, Bouldin attended the country schools, then studied law. He was admitted to the bar, December 6, 1802, and began to practice at Charlotte Court House, Virginia. He was appointed judge of the circuit court.

He supported himself and his family through his slave plantation,  "Golden Hills," near Drakes Branch, Virginia, where he held 30 slaves at the time of his death.

Bouldin was elected as a Jacksonian to the Twenty-first and Twenty-second Congresses (March 4, 1829 – March 3, 1833). He was an unsuccessful candidate for reelection to the Twenty-third Congress.

Bouldin was subsequently elected to the Twenty-third Congress to fill the vacancy caused by the death of John Randolph.  He served from August 26, 1833, until his sudden death in Washington, D.C., February 11, 1834, while addressing the House of Representatives. He was delivering a eulogy for his predecessor, John Randolph. His final words were recorded as being: "But I cannot tell the reasons why his death was not announced, without telling what I told a friend I should say, in case..." He was succeeded in Congress by his brother James Bouldin.

He was interred in a private cemetery on his slave plantation.

Elections

1829; Bouldin was re-elected to the U.S. House of Representatives with 46.09% of the vote, defeating Independents George William Crump and a man identified only as Miller.
1831; Bouldin was re-elected with 58.62% of the vote, defeating Independent Crump.

See also
List of United States Congress members who died in office (1790–1899)

References

Sources

External links

1781 births
1834 deaths
Virginia lawyers
Jacksonian members of the United States House of Representatives from Virginia
Democratic Party members of the United States House of Representatives from Virginia
19th-century American politicians
People from Charlotte County, Virginia
American slave owners